Hans Adolf Karl Wilhelm Grischkat (29 August 1903 – 10 January 1977) was a German conductor, especially a choral conductor, also a church musician and academic teacher. He founded the choir  for pioneering concerts and recordings of works by Bach and Monteverdi in the spirit of historically informed performance.

Career 
Grischkat was born in Hamburg. He studied at the University of Tübingen, first natural sciences, then musicology. He studied at the Musikhochschule Stuttgart with Hermann Keller.

Grischkat was in 1926 the first in Württemberg to perform Bach's St John Passion without cuts, and with period instruments. In 1935 he conducted Bach's St Matthew Passion in historically informed performance, which became influential in southern Germany.

To celebrate Bach's bicentenary of death in 1950, Grischkat compiled single cantata movements, with new texts, to a concert Vom Reiche Gottes (Of God's Kingdom), following an idea by Albert Schweitzer.

Among his students were Frieder Bernius, Wolfgang Gönnenwein, Hanns-Friedrich Kunz and Helmuth Rilling.

He edited and published for Hänssler the series Die Kantate, offering sheet music of sacred works and background. He died in Stuttgart.

Recording 
Grischkat recorded many Bach cantatas with the Schwäbischer Singkreis, beginning in 1951 with Jauchzet Gott in allen Landen, BWV 51, with soloist Margot Guilleaume and the Bach-Orchester Stuttgart. He led in 1953 an early recording of Monteverdi's Vespers of 1610, at least of several movements, with soloists including Margot Guilleaume, Friederike Sailer, Lotte Wolf-Matthäus, Heinz Marten, Werner Hohmann and Franz Kelch. He conducted Bach's Christmas Oratorio in 1972, with Maria Friesenhausen, Hildegard Laurich, Peter Wetzler, Bruce Abel, Schwäbischer Singkreis and Südwestdeutsches Kammerorchester Pforzheim. He performed and recorded Bach's Mass in B minor in 1958, with Friederike Sailer, Margarethe Bence, Fritz Wunderlich and Erich Wenk, Schwäbischer Singkreis and the orchestra of the 35th Deutsches Bachfest.

Selected publications 
 Hans Grischkat (ed): Johann Sebastian Bach: Der Friede sei mit dir. Kantate Nr. 158. Kantate zum 3. Ostertag aus der Reihe: Die Kantate. Eine Sammlung geistlicher Musik für Chor und Instrumente. Band 28, Hänssler Stuttgart 1959, with four facsimile pages

References

Literature 
 Karl Komma: Grischkat, Hans, in Die Musik in Geschichte und Gegenwart, Supplement 16, Bärenreiter-Verlag Kassel 1976, col 538–539, 
 Klaus Peter Leitner: Hans Grischkat (1903–1977), Ein Bachinterpret der Jugendmusikbewegung in Württemberg – eine Biographie, Dissertation Hamburg 2000, 
 Otto Paul Burkhardt: Hans Grischkat und das Musikleben der Stadt Reutlingen, Stadtarchiv Reutlingen,2003. 109 p., 69 illustrations

External links 
 
 Hans Grischkat Who's Who
 Hans Grischkat-Bibliothek Stadtbibliothek Reutlingen
 Werkverzeichnis von Hans Grischkat Carus-Verlag
 Hans Grischkat (1903–1977) The Remington Site
 
 Hans Grischkat Hermann Keller

German music educators
German choral conductors
German male conductors (music)
German musicologists
1903 births
1977 deaths
University of Tübingen alumni
State University of Music and Performing Arts Stuttgart alumni
Musicians from Hamburg
Academic staff of the State University of Music and Performing Arts Stuttgart
20th-century musicologists
20th-century German conductors (music)
20th-century German male musicians